Ada Geller (4 May 1888 – 30 March 1949) was a Zionist and women's rights activist, a teacher and headmaster, and the first woman accountant in Mandatory Palestine.

Biography 
Geller was born on 4 May 1888 in the town Tlumach (currently in Ukraine). Despite her attending a Polish school, she learned the Hebrew language and, later on, also taught Hebrew to girls and young women.

In 1911 she immigrated to Ottoman Palestine, and served as teacher and headmaster at the "Shoshana" handicrafts school in Jerusalem. After the school was closed, in 1922, Geller left for the USA, where she studied accounting and trading. She returned to Palestine in 1927, and, after a relentless negotiation with the British Mandate, succeeded in obtaining an accountant work permit. Thus she became the first woman, and for many years also the sole woman, in this profession. As an accountant, Geller became an executive of the Jerusalem-based King Solomon Bank.

Women's rights activism 
In addition to her work as teacher, executive and accountant, Geller was active as an advocate for women's rights. The handicrafts school she headed was intended to provide educational and occupational opportunities to young women from low socioeconomic background, supported by the "Women's Association for Cultural Work", led by Sarah Thon. After obtaining her accounting permit, she joined an organization of academic women, and was active in the "Organization of Hebrew Women for Equal Rights in Palestine".

Commemoration 
There is an Ada Geller street in Jerusalem and in Beersheba.

References

1888 births
1949 deaths
Israeli women's rights activists
People from Tlumach
Israeli educators
Israeli women educators